This is a list of electoral district results for the 1950 New South Wales state election.

Results by electoral district

Albury

Armidale

Ashfield

Auburn

Balmain 

Mary Quirk was the sitting Labor member, however she was defeated for pre-selection by John McMahon.

Bankstown

Barwon 

The sitting member was Roy Heferen who had been elected as a Labor candidate, however he was disendorsed as a result of voting in the election for the Legislative Council and stood as an Independent labor candidate.

Bathurst

Blacktown

Bondi

Bulli

Burrinjuck 

Burrinjuck was a new seat, largely replacing Yass. Bill Sheahan (Labor) was the member for Yass.

Burwood

Byron

Canterbury

Casino

Castlereagh 

Castlereagh was expanded to include part of Cobar, including the towns of Bourke and Nyngan.

Cessnock

Clarence

Cobar 

Cobar absorbed the entire district of Sturt, but lost the towns of Bourke and Nyngan to Castlereagh and South Broken Hill and Menindee to the re-constituted Sturt.

Collaroy 

Collaroy was a new seat created out of the districts of Hornsby and Manly, both of which were held by the Liberal party.

Concord 

The sitting member, Bill Carlton, died in 1949. The 1949 by-election was won by Brice Mutton, however he died nine months later, with John Adamson winning the 1950 by-election.

Coogee 

The sitting member, Lou Cunningham, died in 1948. The 1948 by-election was won by Kevin Ellis.

Cook's River

Croydon

Darlinghurst 

Frank Finnan (Labor) was the member for [[Results of the 1950 New South Wales state election#Hawkesbury|Hawkesbury]].

Drummoyne

Dubbo

Dulwich Hill

Earlwood

Eastwood

Georges River

Gloucester

Gordon

Gosford

Goulburn

Granville

Hamilton

Hartley

Hawkesbury 

The redistribution made Hawkesbury a notional Liberal seat. The sitting member Frank Finnan (Labor) successfully contested the new district of [[Results of the 1950 New South Wales state election#Darlinghurst|Darlinghurst]].

Hornsby

Hurstville

Illawarra

Kahibah

King

Kogarah 

Kogarah was won by the Liberal Party at a by-election in 1948 caused by the death of Labor's William Currey.

Kurri Kurri

Lake Macquarie

Lakemba 

The sitting member was Fred Stanley who had been elected as a Labor candidate, however he was disendorsed as a result of voting in the election for the Legislative Council and stood as an Independent labor candidate.

Lane Cove

Leichhardt

Lismore

Liverpool

Liverpool Plains

Maitland

Manly

Maroubra 

Bob Heffron (Labor) was the member for the abolished district of Botany which was largely replaced by Maroubra.

Marrickville

Monaro 

The sitting member was John Seiffert who had been elected as a Labor candidate, however he was disendorsed as a result of voting in the election for the Legislative Council and stood as an Independent labor candidate.

Mosman

Mudgee

Murray

Murrumbidgee

Nepean

Neutral Bay

Newcastle

Newtown-Annandale 

 Preferences were not distributed.

Netown-Annandale was a notional Labor seat combining parts of the abolished districts of Newtown and Annandale. Lilian Fowler (Lang Labor) was the member for Newtown.

North Sydney 

The sitting member was James Geraghty who had been elected as a Labor candidate, however he was disendorsed as a result of voting in the election for the Legislative Council and stood as an independent labor candidate.

Orange

Oxley

Paddington

Parramatta

Phillip

Raleigh

Randwick

Redfern

Rockdale

Ryde

South Coast

Sturt 

Sturt was reconstituted, with the former district being absorbed by Cobar. The new district comprised part of Cobar, including the towns of South Broken Hill and Menindee, part of Murray, and the western part of the abolished district of Lachlan.

Sutherland

Tamworth

Temora

Tenterfield

Upper Hunter

Vaucluse

Wagga Wagga

Waratah

Waverley

Willoughby

Wollondilly 

 Preferences were not distributed.

Wollongong-Kembla

Woollahra

Young

See also 

 Candidates of the 1950 New South Wales state election
 Members of the New South Wales Legislative Assembly, 1950–1953

Notes

References 

1950